Carl Froch vs. Jean Pascal, billed as World Class, was a professional boxing match and world championship fight between undefeated duo Carl Froch and Jean Pascal for the vacant WBC super middleweight title. The event is notable for being the professional boxing debut of future champion Tyson Fury.

Background
In 2008, after Joe Calzaghe had moved up in weight to challenge Bernard Hopkins, his WBC super middleweight title became vacant. This meant that challengers Carl Froch and Jermain Taylor were in line to fight for the vacant title. However, Taylor opted to fight former IBF champion Jeff Lacy instead, which meant Jean Pascal would challenge Froch for the title on 8 December 2008. Both men went into the fight with an unbeaten record, but this would be their toughest test to date.

The Fight
A hard fought and intense encounter was entertaining from the off, with both men landing heavy blows and showing great toughness and determination. This continued throughout yet it was Froch who was able to take control in the second half of the fight and edge the closely fought rounds, and went on to win by unanimous decision with scores of 116-112, 117-111 and 118-110 to win his first world title. It was later revealed that Froch had suffered a perforated eardrum and cracked rib in his final sparring session ten days before the fight, but refused to pull out. Froch went on to hold multiple titles in the division, while Pascal moved up to light-heavyweight and also became champion. The two men became friends after the fight.

Broadcasting and Undercard
The fight was shown live on the free to air ITV in host nation United Kingdom. The undercard also featured several other fighters:

Scott Lawton defeated Martin Gethin - TKO 9

Danny McIntosh defeated Rod Anderton - TKO 1

Tyson Fury defeated Bela Gyongyosi - TKO 1

References 

Boxing matches
Boxing matches involving Tyson Fury
2008 in boxing
Boxing in England
2008 in British sport
December 2008 sports events in Europe